Jābir ibn Yazīd al-Juʿfī, died –750, was a Kufan transmitter of hadith and a companion of the Shi'a Imams Muhammad al-Baqir (677–732) and Ja'far al-Sadiq (–765). His reputation among later Muslims was uneven: while some Sunni and Shia scholars considered him a reliable authority, others rejected him for his alleged 'extremist' or 'exaggerated' ideas. In some sources he is said to have followed the ideas of the 'exaggerator' al-Mughira ibn Sa'id, while other sources deny this.

Jabir is also the main narrator of some other hadiths which are collected in a book named .

Jabir is also transmitter of the  book , which contains Muhammad al-Baqir's answers to questions posed by his followers. In the main part of this book, al-Baqir reveals secrets to al-Ju'fi, such as how the cosmos was created, how the human soul fell into this world, and how it could be delivered from it. According to Henry Corbin, this book resembles the Infancy Gospel of Thomas, thus illustrating a similarity between Shia Imamology and gnostic Christology. A major concept of this work is the description of the numinous experience. Its central motif is the psychological and philosophical explanation of spiritual symbols, with believers instructed to perform acts of self-purification and renewal. Colors are used to symbolize theories and levels of consciousness which one must recognize in oneself.

References

Works cited
 

 
 

Year of birth unknown
Year of death unknown
Shia scholars of Islam
8th-century Muslim scholars of Islam
Iraqi Shia Muslims
Ghulat